KLPR (91.1 FM) is a radio station broadcasting an alternative music format. Licensed to Kearney, Nebraska, United States, the station is owned by the University of Nebraska at Kearney.

Construction permit

On July 28, 2011 KLPR was granted a U.S. Federal Communications Commission construction permit to increase ERP to 3,800 watts and increase HAAT to 36.7 meters.

References

External links
 
 
FCC construction permit

LPR
LPR